Sharpley is an unincorporated community in New Castle County, Delaware, United States in the Brandywine Hundred. It is within ZIP Code Tabulation Area for 19803.

Geography
Husbands Run and its tributary Willow Run rise in the neighborhood.

History
The name Sharpley is from a farmer in the area first recorded in 1691.

Like neighboring Woodbrook, Edenridge, and Tavistock, Sharpley was developed by Woodlawn Trustees. The process began in the 1950s and continued into the 1970s.

Notable person
Gregory Lavelle, Republican member of the Delaware General Assembly from 2001 to 2019

References 

Unincorporated communities in New Castle County, Delaware
Unincorporated communities in Delaware
Populated places established in 1956